Pius Msekwa (born 9 June 1935) was the Speaker of the National Assembly of Tanzania from April 1994 to November 2005. He chaired the CPA Executive Committee from 1999 to 2002. He later became vice-chairman of the ruling party Chama Cha Mapinduzi.

Bibliography
Pius Msekwa, Reflections on Tanzania's First Multi-Party Parliament : 1995-2000,

References

1935 births
Living people
Chama Cha Mapinduzi politicians
Speakers of the National Assembly (Tanzania)
Pugu Secondary School alumni
Makerere University alumni
University of Dar es Salaam alumni
Tanzanian Roman Catholics